UDCA may refer to
The University District Community Association of University District, Detroit
Union de Defense Commercants et Artisans, a French political organization
Ursodeoxycholic acid
 Upside Down Count and Attitude, a signaling convention in the card game bridge